Nocardiopsis halotolerans  is a halotolerant bacterium from the genus of Nocardiopsis which has been isolated from salt marsh soil from the desert in Kuwait.

References

Further reading

External links
Type strain of Nocardiopsis halotolerans at BacDive -  the Bacterial Diversity Metadatabase

Actinomycetales
Bacteria described in 2002